Charles Palmetier (December 29, 1834 - ?) was an American businessman and politician.

Born in the town of Catskill, New York, Palmetier moved to Wisconsin Territory in 1847 and settled in Geneva, Wisconsin in 1861. Palmetier was a lumber dealer. He served in the 8th Wisconsin Volunteer Infantry Regiment during the American Civil War. Palmetier served in local government: town board, school board, etc. He served in the Wisconsin State Senate as a Republican in 1882 and 1883.

Notes

1834 births
Year of death unknown
People from Catskill, New York
People from Geneva, Wisconsin
People of Wisconsin in the American Civil War
Republican Party Wisconsin state senators